The American Cinematheque Award annually honors "an extraordinary artist in the entertainment industry who is fully engaged in his or her work and is committed to making a significant contribution to the art of the motion pictures". These are organised by American Cinematheque, an independent, non-profit cultural organization in Los Angeles dedicated exclusively to the public presentation of the moving image in all its forms.

Recipients

Sid Grauman Award awardees
The American Cinematheque's Sid Grauman Award annually honors "an individual who has made a significant contribution to the Hollywood film industry in the continuing advancement of theatrical exhibition".

References

American film awards